The 532nd Engineer Boat and Shore Regiment was a United States Army engineer unit that served in World War II and the Korean War. It was designated the 532nd Engineer Amphibian Regiment in July 1943 and was assigned to the 2nd Engineer Special Brigade.

One member, Junior Van Noy, was posthumously awarded the Medal of Honor for actions during the Huon Peninsula campaign.

References
Baldwin, William C. (1985). "Amphibian Engineers in World War II", Engineer, 4.
Becker, Marshall O. (1946). The Amphibious Training Center. Washington, D.C.: Historical Section, Army Ground Forces.
Stanton, Shelby L. (2006). World War II Order of Battle: An Encyclopedic Reference to U.S. Army Ground Forces from Battalion through Division, 1939-1946 (Revised Edition). Mechanicsburg: Stackpole
 

Military units and formations established in 1943
1943 establishments in the United States
Engineer Regiments of the United States Army
United States Army regiments in World War II
United States Army units and formations in the Korean War